John Wayne Gacy (March 17, 1942 – May 10, 1994) was an American serial killer and sex offender who raped, tortured, and murdered at least 33 young men and boys in Norwood Park Township, Illinois, a suburb of Chicago. He became known as the Killer Clown due to his public performances as "Pogo the Clown" or "Patches the Clown", personas he had devised, prior to the discovery of his crimes.

Gacy committed all of his murders inside his ranch-style house in Norwood Park Township. Typically, he would lure a victim to his home and dupe them into donning handcuffs on the pretext of demonstrating a magic trick. He would then rape and torture his captive before killing them by either asphyxiation or strangulation with a garrote. Twenty-six victims were buried in the crawl space of his home, and three others were buried elsewhere on his property; four were discarded in the Des Plaines River.

Gacy had previously been convicted in 1968 of the sodomy of a teenage boy in Waterloo, Iowa, and was sentenced to ten years' imprisonment, but served eighteen months. He murdered his first victim in 1972, had murdered twice more by the end of 1975, and murdered at least thirty subsequent victims after his divorce from his second wife in 1976. The investigation into the disappearance of Des Plaines teenager Robert Piest led to Gacy's arrest on December 21, 1978.

His conviction for thirty-three murders (by one individual) then covered the most homicides in United States legal history. Gacy was sentenced to death on March 13, 1980. On death row at Menard Correctional Center, he spent much of his time painting. He was executed by lethal injection at Stateville Correctional Center on May 10, 1994.

Early life
John Wayne Gacy was born at Edgewater Hospital in Chicago, Illinois, on March 17, 1942, the second child and only son of John Stanley Gacy (June 20, 1900 – December 25, 1969) and Marion Elaine Gacy, née Robison (May 4, 1908 – December 14, 1989). His father was an auto repair machinist and World War I veteran, and his mother was a homemaker. Gacy was of Polish and Danish ancestry, and his family was Catholic. His paternal grandparents (who spelled the family name as "Gatza" or "Gaca") had immigrated to the U.S. from Poland (then part of the German state of Prussia).

Childhood
Gacy was close to his mother and two sisters, but endured a difficult relationship with his father, an alcoholic who was physically abusive to his family. The elder Gacy frequently belittled his son, calling him "dumb and stupid" and comparing him unfavorably with his sisters. One of Gacy's earliest memories was of his father beating him with a leather belt for accidentally disarranging components of a car engine he had assembled. His mother tried to shield her son from his father's abuse, which only resulted in accusations that he was a "sissy" and a "mama's boy" who would "probably grow up queer". Despite this mistreatment, however, Gacy still loved his father, but felt he was "never good enough" in his father's eyes.

In 1949, Gacy's father was informed that his son and another boy had been caught sexually fondling a young girl. His father whipped him with a razor strop as punishment. The same year, a family friend and contractor would sometimes molest Gacy in his truck. Gacy never told his father about this, afraid that his father would blame him.

Gacy was an overweight and unathletic child. Because of a heart condition, he was told to avoid all sports at school. During the fourth grade, Gacy began to experience blackouts. He was hospitalized on occasion because of these episodes and also, in 1957, for a burst appendix. Gacy later estimated that between the ages of 14 and 18, he had spent almost a year in hospital and attributed the decline of his grades to missing school. His father suspected these episodes were an effort to gain sympathy and attention and openly accused his son of faking the condition as Gacy lay in a hospital bed. Although his mother, sisters, and few close friends never doubted his illness, Gacy's medical condition was never conclusively diagnosed.

One of Gacy's friends in high school recalled several instances when his father ridiculed or beat his son without provocation. On one occasion in 1957, he witnessed Gacy's father emerging drunk from the family basement to begin belittling, then hitting his son for no apparent reason. Gacy's mother attempted to intervene as her son simply "put up his hands to defend himself". According to the friend, Gacy never struck his father back during these altercations.

Career origins
In 1960, at age 18, Gacy became involved in politics, working as an assistant precinct captain for a Democratic Party candidate in his neighborhood. This led to more criticism from his father, who accused his son of being a "patsy". Gacy later speculated his decision to become involved in politics was actually to seek the acceptance from others that he never received from his father.

The same year Gacy's political involvement began, his father bought him a car. He kept the vehicle's title in his own name until Gacy had finished paying for it. These monthly payments took several years for him to complete. His father would confiscate the keys to the vehicle if Gacy did not do as he said. In April 1962, Gacy purchased an extra set of keys after his father confiscated the original set. In response, his father removed the distributor cap, keeping the component for three days. Gacy recalled he felt "totally sick" and "drained" after this incident.

Las Vegas
Hours after his father replaced the distributor cap, Gacy left home and drove to Las Vegas, Nevada, with $136 to his name in the hope of residing with a female cousin who had relocated to the city after severing ties with her family two years prior. He alternately slept in his car or cheap motels over the course of three days as he traveled to the city. Gacy found work within the city's ambulance service before he was transferred to work as an attendant at Palm Mortuary.

As a mortuary attendant, Gacy slept on a cot behind the embalming room. He worked there for three months, observing morticians embalming dead bodies and occasionally serving as a pallbearer. Gacy later confessed that one evening, while alone, he had clambered into the coffin of a deceased teenage male, embracing and caressing the body before experiencing a sense of shock. This prompted Gacy to call his mother the next day and ask whether his father would allow him to return home. His father agreed, and the same day he drove back to Chicago.

Springfield
On returning home, Gacy enrolled at Northwestern Business College, despite having failed to graduate from high school. He graduated in 1963 and took a management trainee position with the Nunn-Bush Shoe Company. In 1964, the shoe company transferred him to Springfield, Illinois, to work as a salesman, and eventually promoted him to manager of his department. In March of that year, he became engaged to Marlynn Myers, a co-worker.

During their courtship, Gacy joined the local Jaycees and worked tirelessly for them, being named Key Man in April 1964. That same year, he had his second homosexual experience. According to Gacy, after one of his colleagues in the Springfield Jaycees plied him with drinks and invited him to spend the evening on his sofa, he agreed; the colleague then performed oral sex on him while he was drunk. By 1965, Gacy had risen to the position of vice-president of the Springfield Jaycees. The same year, he was named the third most outstanding Jaycee in the state of Illinois.

Waterloo, Iowa

KFC manager
After a six-month courtship, Gacy and Myers married in September 1964. Marlynn's father subsequently purchased three Kentucky Fried Chicken (KFC) restaurants in Waterloo, Iowa. The couple moved there so Gacy could manage the restaurants, with the understanding that they would move into Marlynn's parents' former home, which had been vacated for the couple. The offer was lucrative: Gacy would receive $15,000 per year (the equivalent of about $144,000 ), plus a share of the restaurant's profits.

Following the obligatory completion of a management course, Gacy relocated to Waterloo with his wife. He opened a "club" in his basement where his employees could drink alcohol and play pool. Although Gacy employed teenagers of both sexes at his restaurants, he socialized only with the young men. Gacy gave many of them alcohol before he made sexual advances; if they rebuffed him, he would claim his advances were simply jokes or a test of morals.

Gacy's wife gave birth to a son in February 1966 and a daughter in March 1967. Gacy later described this period of his life as "perfect"—he had finally earned his father's approval. When Gacy's parents paid a family visit in July 1966, his father privately apologized for the physical and emotional abuse he had inflicted throughout his son's childhood and adolescence before happily saying, "Son, I was wrong about you," as he shook Gacy's hand.

Waterloo Jaycees
In Waterloo, Gacy joined the local Jaycees chapter, regularly offering extended hours to the organization in addition to the 12- and 14-hour days he worked managing the three KFC restaurants. At meetings, Gacy often provided fried chicken and insisted on being called "Colonel". He and other Waterloo Jaycees were also deeply involved in wife swapping, prostitution, pornography, and drug use.

Although Gacy was considered ambitious and something of a braggart, the other Jaycees held him in high regard for his fundraising work, and in 1967 named him "outstanding vice-president" of the Waterloo Jaycees. The same year, Gacy served on the board of directors.

Assault of Donald Voorhees
In August 1967, Gacy sexually assaulted 15-year-old Donald Voorhees Jr., the son of Donald E. Voorhees, a local politician and a fellow Jaycee. Gacy lured Voorhees to his house upon the promise of showing him heterosexual stag films regularly played at Jaycee events. Gacy plied Voorhees with alcohol, allowed him to watch a stag movie, then persuaded him to engage in mutual oral sex, adding, "You have to have sex with a man before you start having sex with women." Over the following months Gacy similarly abused several other youths, including one whom he encouraged to have sex with his own wife before blackmailing him into performing oral sex on him. Gacy also tricked several teenagers into believing he was commissioned to conduct homosexual experiments in the interests of scientific research, and paid them up to $50 each.

In March 1968, Voorhees reported to his father that Gacy had sexually assaulted him. Voorhees Sr. immediately informed the police, who arrested Gacy and subsequently charged him with performing oral sodomy on Voorhees and the attempted assault of 16-year-old Edward Lynch. Gacy vehemently denied the charges and demanded to take a polygraph test. The results of these tests were "indicative of deception" when Gacy denied any wrongdoing in relation to both young men.

Gacy publicly denied any wrongdoing and insisted the charges against him were politically motivated—Voorhees Sr. had opposed Gacy's nomination for appointment as president of the Iowa Jaycees. Several fellow Jaycees found Gacy's story credible and rallied to his support. However, on May 10, 1968, Gacy was indicted on the sodomy charge.

Witness intimidation

On August 30, 1968, Gacy persuaded one of his employees, 18-year-old Russell Schroeder, to physically assault Voorhees in an effort to discourage the boy from testifying against him in court. Gacy promised to pay Schroeder $300. Schroeder agreed, and in early September lured Voorhees to an isolated country park, sprayed Mace in his eyes, then beat him. Voorhees escaped and reported the assault to police, identifying Schroeder as his attacker. They arrested him the following day. While initially denying any involvement, Schroeder soon confessed to assaulting Voorhees, indicating he had done so at Gacy's request. Police arrested Gacy and laid an additional charge of hiring Schroeder to assault and intimidate Voorhees against him.

On September 12, Gacy was ordered to undergo a psychiatric evaluation at the Psychiatric Hospital of the University of Iowa. Two doctors examined him over a period of seventeen days before concluding he had an antisocial personality disorder (the clinical term for sociopathy and/or psychopathy) and was unlikely to benefit from any therapy or medical treatment, and that his behavior pattern was likely to bring him into repeated conflict with society. The doctors concluded he was mentally competent to stand trial.

Conviction and imprisonment
On November 7, 1968, Gacy pleaded guilty to one count of sodomy in relation to Voorhees, but not guilty to the charges related to other youths. Gacy claimed Voorhees had offered himself to him and that he had acted out of curiosity. His story was not believed. Gacy was convicted of sodomy on December 3 and sentenced to ten years' imprisonment, to be served at the Anamosa State Penitentiary. That same day, Gacy's wife petitioned for divorce, requesting she be awarded the couple's home and property, sole custody of their two children, and alimony. The Court ruled in her favor, and the divorce was finalized on September 18, 1969. Gacy never saw his first wife or children again.

During his incarceration in the Anamosa State Penitentiary, Gacy rapidly acquired a reputation as a model prisoner. Within months of his arrival, he had risen to the position of head cook. He also joined the inmate Jaycee chapter and increased its membership from 50 to 650 men in less than eighteen months. Gacy also secured an increase in the inmates' daily pay in the prison mess hall and supervised several projects to improve conditions for inmates in the prison. By the fall of 1969, Gacy had overseen the installation of a miniature golf course in the prison recreation yard; he was presented with a distinguished service award for his tireless efforts within the inmate Jaycee chapter in February 1970.

In June 1969, Gacy was denied parole. To prepare for a second scheduled parole hearing in May 1970, he completed sixteen high school courses, for which he obtained his diploma in November 1969.

On Christmas Day 1969, Gacy's father died from cirrhosis of the liver. When informed of his father's death, Gacy collapsed to the floor, sobbing. His request for supervised compassionate leave to attend the funeral was denied.

Return to Chicago
Gacy was granted parole with twelve months' probation on June 18, 1970, after having served eighteen months of his ten-year sentence. Conditions of his probation included that Gacy relocate to Chicago to live with his mother, and that he must observe a 10:00 p.m. curfew.

On his release, Gacy told friend and fellow Jaycee Clarence Lane—who picked him up from the prison and had remained steadfast in his belief of Gacy's innocence—that he would "never go back to jail" and that he intended to re-establish himself in Waterloo. However, within 24 hours of his release, Gacy had relocated to Chicago. He arrived there by bus on June 19 and shortly thereafter obtained a job as a short-order cook in a restaurant.

On February 12, 1971, Gacy was charged with sexually assaulting a teenage boy who claimed that he had lured him into his car at Chicago's Greyhound bus terminal and driven him to his home, where he had attempted to force the boy into sex. The court dismissed this complaint when the boy failed to appear. On June 22, Gacy was arrested and charged with aggravated sexual battery and reckless conduct. The arrest was in response to a complaint filed by a youth who claimed that Gacy had flashed a sheriff's badge, lured him into his car, and forced him to perform oral sex. These charges were dropped after the complainant attempted to blackmail Gacy.

The Iowa Board of Parole did not learn of these incidents and eight months later, on October 18, 1971, Gacy's parole ended. The following month, the records of Gacy's previous criminal convictions in Iowa were sealed.

8213 West Summerdale Avenue
With financial assistance from his mother, Gacy bought a ranch house near the village of Norridge in Norwood Park Township, an unincorporated area of Cook County, itself a part of metropolitan Chicago. He resided at the address, 8213 West Summerdale Avenue, until his arrest in December 1978 and, according to Gacy, committed all his murders there.

Gacy was active in his local community and helpful towards his neighbors; he willingly loaned his construction tools and plowed snow from neighborhood walks free of charge. Between 1974 and 1978, he hosted annual summer parties, each devoted to a particular theme. These events were attended by up to four hundred people, including politicians and business associates.

Second marriage and divorce 
In August 1971, shortly after Gacy and his mother moved into the house, he became engaged to Carole Hoff, whom he had briefly dated in high school. They were married on July 1, 1972. Carole and her two young daughters from a previous marriage moved into Gacy's home soon after the couple announced their engagement. His mother moved out of the house shortly before the wedding.

By 1975, Gacy had told his wife that he was bisexual. After the couple had sex on Mother's Day that year, he informed her this would be "the last time" they would ever have sex. He began spending most evenings away from home, only to return in the early hours of the morning with the excuse he had been working late. Carole observed Gacy bringing teenage boys into his garage in the early hours and also found gay pornography and men's wallets and identification inside the house. When she confronted Gacy about who these items belonged to, he informed her angrily that it was none of her business.

Following a heated argument when she failed to balance a checkbook correctly in October 1975, Carole asked Gacy for a divorce. He agreed to his wife's request although, by mutual consent, she continued to live at the West Summerdale house until February 1976, when she and her daughters moved into their own apartment. One month later, on March 2, the Gacys' divorce—decreed upon the false grounds of Gacy's infidelity with women—was finalized.

PDM Contractors
In 1971, Gacy established a part-time construction business, PDM Contractors. The initials "PDM" were for "Painting, Decorating, and Maintenance". With the approval of his probation officer, Gacy worked evenings on his construction contracts while working as a cook during the day. Initially, he undertook minor repair work, such as sign-writing, pouring concrete and redecorating, but later expanded to include projects such as interior design, remodeling, installation, assembly and landscaping. In mid-1973, Gacy quit his job as a cook so he could commit fully to his construction business.

By 1975, PDM was expanding rapidly, and Gacy was working up to sixteen hours per day. In March 1977, he became a supervisor for PE Systems, a firm specializing in the remodeling of drugstores. Between PE Systems and PDM, Gacy worked on up to four projects simultaneously and frequently traveled to other states. By 1978, PDM's annual revenue was over $200,000.

Clown

Through his membership in a local Moose Club, Gacy became aware of a "Jolly Joker" clown club, whose members regularly performed at fundraising events and parades in addition to voluntarily entertaining hospitalized children. In late 1975, Gacy joined the clown club and created his own clown characters "Pogo the Clown" and "Patches the Clown", devising his own makeup and costumes. He described Pogo as a "happy clown", whereas Patches was a "more serious" character.

Gacy seldom earned money for his performances and later said that acting as a clown allowed him to "regress into childhood". He performed as both Pogo and Patches at numerous local parties, political functions, charitable events, and children's hospitals. On occasion, Gacy would briefly drink at a local bar after performing as either of his clowning personas before returning home. Gacy's voluntary public service as a clown throughout the years of his murders led to him being known as the "Killer Clown".

Employees
Much of PDM's workforce consisted of high school students and young men. Gacy would often proposition his workers for sex, or insist on sexual favors in return for acts such as lending his vehicles, financial assistance or promotions. Gacy also claimed to own guns, once telling an employee, "Do you know how easy it would be to get one of my guns and kill you—and how easy it would be to get rid of the body?"

In 1973, Gacy and a teenage employee traveled to Florida to view a property Gacy had purchased. On the first night in Florida, Gacy raped the employee in their hotel room. After returning to Chicago, this employee drove to Gacy's house and beat him in his front yard. Gacy told his wife he had been attacked for refusing to pay him for poor quality painting work.

In May 1975, Gacy hired 15-year-old Anthony Antonucci. Two months later, he went to Antonucci's home, knowing the youth had injured his foot in an accident the previous day. The two drank a bottle of wine, then watched a heterosexual stag film before Gacy wrestled Antonucci to the floor and cuffed his hands behind his back. One cuff was loose and Antonucci freed his arm while Gacy was out of the room. When Gacy returned, Antonucci—a high school wrestler—pounced upon him. He wrestled Gacy to the floor, obtained possession of the handcuff key, and cuffed Gacy's hands behind his back. At first, Gacy threatened Antonucci, then calmed down and promised to leave if he would remove the handcuffs. Antonucci agreed and Gacy left. Antonucci later recalled that Gacy told him: "Not only are you the only one who got out of the cuffs, you got them on me." He continued working for PDM for nine months after this incident, and Gacy made no further attempts to assault him.

On July 26, 1976, Gacy picked up 18-year-old David Cram as he hitchhiked on Elston Avenue. Gacy offered him a job with PDM, and he began work the same evening. On August 21, Cram moved into his house. The next day, Cram and Gacy had several drinks to celebrate his 19th birthday, with Gacy dressed as Pogo. Gacy conned Cram into donning handcuffs, his wrists cuffed in front of his body rather than behind. He swung Cram around while holding the chain linking the cuffs, then said he intended to rape him. Cram kicked Gacy in the face and freed himself from the handcuffs.

A month later, Gacy appeared at Cram's bedroom door intending to rape him, saying, "Dave, you really don't know who I am. Maybe it would be good if you give me what I want." Cram resisted, straddling Gacy, who left the bedroom, stating, "You ain't no fun." Cram moved out on October 5 and left PDM, although he did periodically work for Gacy over the following two years. Shortly after Cram moved out of Gacy's house another employee, 18-year-old Michael Rossi, moved in. Rossi had worked for PDM since May 23, 1976. He lived with Gacy until April 1977. Rossi sometimes assisted Gacy in clowning at grand openings of businesses: Gacy as Pogo and Rossi as Patches.

Politics

Gacy also entered local Democratic Party politics, initially offering use of his employees to clean party headquarters at no charge. He was rewarded for his community service with an appointment to serve on the Norwood Park Township street lighting committee, subsequently earning the title of precinct captain.

In 1975, Gacy was appointed director of Chicago's annual Polish Constitution Day Parade, an event he would supervise until 1978. Through his work with the parade, Gacy met and was photographed with First Lady Rosalynn Carter on May 6, 1978. The event later became an embarrassment to the United States Secret Service. In the pictures, Gacy is wearing an "S" pin, indicating a person given special clearance.

Murders
Gacy murdered at least 33 young men and boys, and buried 26 of them in the crawl space of his house. His victims included people he knew and random individuals lured from Chicago's Greyhound Bus station, Bughouse Square, or simply off the streets with the promise of a job with PDM, an offer of drink and/or drugs, or money for sex. Some victims were grabbed by force; others conned into believing Gacy (who often carried a sheriff's badge and had spotlights on his black Oldsmobile) was a policeman.

Gacy usually lured a lone victim to his house, although on more than one occasion Gacy also had what he called "doubles"—two victims killed in the same evening.

Inside Gacy's home, his usual modus operandi was to ply a youth with drink, drugs, or generally gain his trust. He would then produce a pair of handcuffs to "show a magic trick", sometimes as part of a clowning routine. He typically cuffed his own hands behind his back, then surreptitiously released himself with the key which he hid between his fingers. He then offered to show his intended victim how to release himself from the handcuffs. With his victim manacled and unable to free himself, Gacy then made a statement to the effect that "The trick is, you have to have the key." Gacy referred to this act of restraining his victim as the "handcuff trick".

Having restrained his victim, Gacy proceeded to rape and torture his captive. He frequently began by sitting on or straddling himself above his victim's chest before forcing the victim to fellate him. Gacy then inflicted acts of torture including burning with cigars, making his captive imitate a horse as he sat on their back and pulled upon makeshift reins around their necks, and violation with foreign objects such as dildos and prescription bottles after he had sodomized his captive. To immobilize his captives' legs before engaging in acts of torture, Gacy frequently manacled their ankles to a two-by-four with handcuffs attached at each end, an act inspired by the Houston Mass Murders. He also verbally taunted many of his victims throughout their continued abuse, and was known to have dragged or forced several victims to crawl into his bathroom, where he partly drowned them in the bathtub before repeatedly reviving them, enabling him to continue his prolonged assault. In instances when a victim had pleaded to be killed as opposed to continuing to endure torture, Gacy would make a statement to the effect he would kill his victim when he wanted to.

Gacy typically murdered his victims by placing a rope tourniquet around their neck before progressively tightening the rope with a hammer handle. He referred to this act as the "rope trick", frequently informing his captive, "This is the last trick." In at least one instance, he had read part of Psalm 23 as he tightened the rope around his victim's neck. Occasionally, the victim had convulsed for an "hour or two" before dying, although several victims died by asphyxiation from cloth gags stuffed deep into their throat. Except for his two final victims, all were murdered between 3:00 a.m. and 6:00 a.m.

After death, Gacy usually stored the victims' bodies under his bed for up to 24 hours before burying his victim in the crawl space, where he periodically poured quicklime to hasten the decomposition of his victims. Some victims' bodies were taken to his garage and embalmed prior to their burial.

Murder of Timothy McCoy

Gacy's first known murder occurred on January 3, 1972. According to Gacy's later account, following a family party on the evening of January 2, he decided to drive to the Civic Center in the Loop to view a display of ice sculptures in the early hours of the following morning. He then lured a 16-year-old named Timothy Jack McCoy from Chicago's Greyhound Bus Terminal into his car. McCoy was returning from a Christmas vacation in Eaton Rapids, Michigan, to his father's home in Omaha, Nebraska, and informed Gacy in their initial conversation his connecting bus to Nebraska was not due until noon. Gacy took McCoy on a sightseeing tour of Chicago and then drove him to his home with the promise that he could spend the remainder of the night and be driven back to the station in time to catch his bus. Prior to McCoy's identification, he was known simply as the "Greyhound Bus Boy".

Gacy claimed he woke early the following morning to find McCoy standing in his bedroom doorway with a kitchen knife in his hand. He then jumped from his bed and McCoy raised both arms in a gesture of surrender, tilting the knife upwards and accidentally cutting Gacy's forearm. Gacy twisted the knife from McCoy's wrist, banged his head against the bedroom wall, kicked him against his wardrobe and walked towards him. McCoy then kicked Gacy in the stomach, doubling him over. Gacy then grabbed McCoy, shouting, "Motherfucker! I'll kill you!" He then wrestled McCoy to the floor and stabbed him repeatedly in the chest as he straddled him.

As McCoy lay dying, Gacy claimed he washed the knife in his bathroom, then went to his kitchen and saw an opened carton of eggs and a slab of unsliced bacon on his kitchen table. McCoy had also set the table for two; he had walked into Gacy's room to wake him while absentmindedly carrying the kitchen knife in his hand. Gacy buried McCoy in his crawl space and later covered his grave with a layer of concrete. In an interview several years after his arrest, Gacy said that immediately after killing McCoy, he felt "totally drained", yet noted that as he stabbed McCoy and as he listened to the "gurgulations" and gasping for air that he had experienced a mind-numbing orgasm. He added: "That's when I realized that death was the ultimate thrill."

Second murder
Gacy said the second time he committed murder was around January 1974. This victim remains unidentified. Gacy strangled him and then placed the body in his closet before burial. He later stated that bodily fluids leaked from the victim's mouth and nose, staining his carpet. As a result, Gacy regularly stuffed cloth rags, the victim's own underwear, or a sock into the mouths of subsequent victims to prevent such a leakage from occurring prior to their burial.

Murder of John Butkovich

On July 31, 1975, John Butkovich, an 18-year-old PDM employee from Lombard, disappeared. Butkovich's car was found parked near the corner of Sheridan and Lawrence with his jacket and wallet inside and the keys still in the ignition.

The day before his disappearance, Butkovich had confronted Gacy over two weeks' outstanding back pay. Butkovich's father, a Yugoslav immigrant, called Gacy, who claimed he was happy to help search for his son but was sorry Butkovich had "run away". When questioned by police, Gacy said Butkovich and two friends had arrived at his house demanding the overdue pay, but they had reached a compromise and all three had left. Over the following three years, Butkovich's parents called police more than 100 times, urging them to investigate Gacy further.

Gacy later admitted to encountering Butkovich exiting his car at the corner of West Lawrence Avenue, waving to attract his attention. According to Gacy, Butkovich approached his car, stating, "I wanna talk to you." Gacy invited Butkovich into his car, then invited him back to his home, ostensibly to settle the issue of his overdue wages.

At his home, Gacy offered Butkovich a drink, then conned him into allowing his wrists to be cuffed behind his back. Gacy later confessed to having "sat on the kid's chest for a while" before he strangled him. He stowed Butkovich's body in his garage, intending to bury the body later in the crawl space. When his wife and stepdaughters returned home earlier than expected, Gacy buried Butkovich's body under the concrete floor of the tool room extension of his garage in an empty space where he had initially intended to dig a drain tile.

Cruising years
In addition to being the year his business expanded, Gacy freely admitted that 1975 was also when he began to increase the frequency of his excursions for sex with young males. He often referred to these jaunts as "cruising". Gacy committed most of his murders between 1976 and 1978, as he largely lived alone following his divorce. He later referred to these as his "cruising years".

Although Gacy remained gregarious and civic-minded, several neighbors noticed erratic changes in his behavior after his 1976 divorce. This included seeing him keeping company with young males, hearing his car arrive or depart in the early hours of the morning, or seeing lights in his home switch on and off in the early hours. One neighbor later recollected that, for several years, the sounds of muffled high-pitched screaming, shouting, and crying had repeatedly awakened her and her son in the early morning hours. She identified the sounds as emanating from a house adjacent to theirs on West Summerdale Avenue.

1976
One month after his divorce was finalized, Gacy abducted and murdered 18-year-old Darrell Samson. He was last seen alive in Chicago on April 6, 1976. Gacy buried him under the dining room, with a section of cloth lodged in his throat. Five weeks later, on the afternoon of May 14, 15-year-old Randall Reffett disappeared shortly after returning to his Uptown home from a dental appointment. He was last seen by his grandmother later that afternoon. Hours after Reffett was last seen by his family, 14-year-old Samuel Stapleton vanished as he walked home from his sister's apartment. He and Reffett were close acquaintances; both were buried together in the crawl space, and investigators believe the two were murdered the same evening.

On June 3, Gacy killed a 17-year-old Lakeview teenager named Michael Bonnin. He disappeared while traveling from Chicago to Waukegan. Gacy strangled Bonnin with a ligature and buried him under the spare bedroom. Ten days later, Gacy murdered a 16-year-old Uptown youth named William Carroll and buried him in a common grave in the crawl space. Carroll seems to have been the first of four victims known to have been murdered between June 13 and August 6, 1976. Three were between 16 and 17 years old, and one unidentified murder victim appears to have been an adult.

On August 5, a 16-year-old Minnesota youth named James Haakenson is last known to have phoned his family, possibly from Gacy's home. Haakenson died of suffocation. His body was buried in the crawl space beneath the body of a 17-year-old Bensenville youth named Rick Johnston, who was last seen alive on August 6.

Gacy is thought to have murdered two further unidentified males between August and October 1976. On October 24, Gacy abducted and killed teenage friends Kenneth Parker and Michael Marino: the two were last seen outside a restaurant on Clark Street in Chicago. Two days later, a 19-year-old construction worker, William Bundy, disappeared after informing his family he was to attend a party. Bundy died of suffocation. Gacy buried the body beneath his master bedroom. He had apparently worked for Gacy.

Between November and December 1976, Gacy murdered a 21-year-old named Francis Alexander. His last contact with his family was a phone call to his mother made sometime in November. Alexander was buried in the crawl space directly beneath the room Gacy used as his office.

In December 1976, another PDM employee, 17-year-old Gregory Godzik, disappeared. His girlfriend last saw him outside her house after he had driven her home following a date. Godzik had worked for PDM for less than three weeks before he disappeared. He had informed his family that Gacy had had him "dig trenches for some kind of (drain) tiles" in his crawl space. Godzik's car was later found abandoned in Niles. His parents and older sister, Eugenia, contacted Gacy about Godzik's disappearance. Gacy claimed that he had run away from home, having indicated before that he wished to do so. Gacy also claimed to have received an answering machine message from Godzik shortly after he had disappeared. When asked if he could play back the message to Godzik's parents, Gacy said he had erased it.

1977
On January 20, 1977, Gacy lured 19-year-old John Szyc to his house on the pretext of buying his Plymouth Satellite. He later confessed to strangling Szyc in his spare bedroom, claiming Rossi was asleep in the house the following morning. Gacy later sold the car to Rossi for $300.

Two months later, on March 15, a 20-year-old Michigan native named Jon Prestidge disappeared. Prestidge was last seen leaving a Near North Side restaurant. He was buried in the crawl space above the body of Francis Alexander. Shortly before his disappearance, Prestidge had mentioned he had obtained work with a local contractor. Gacy murdered one additional unidentified youth and buried him in the crawl space in the spring or early summer of 1977; the exact time of this murder is unknown. On July 5, Gacy killed a 19-year-old from Crystal Lake, Matthew Bowman. Bowman's mother last saw him at a suburban train station; he had intended to travel to Harwood Heights for a scheduled court appointment regarding an unpaid parking ticket.

The following month, Rossi was arrested for stealing gasoline while driving Szyc's car. The gas station attendant noted the license plate and police traced the car to Gacy's house. When questioned, Gacy told officers that Szyc had sold the car to him in February, saying he needed money to leave town. A check of the VIN confirmed the car had belonged to Szyc. The police did not pursue the matter further, although they did inform Szyc's mother that her son had sold his car.

By the end of 1977, it is known Gacy had murdered six more young men between the ages of 16 and 21. The first of these victims was 18-year-old Robert Gilroy, the son of a Chicago police sergeant, last seen alive on September 15. Gilroy lived just four blocks from Gacy's house; he was murdered and buried in the crawl space. On September 12, Gacy had flown to Pittsburgh, Pennsylvania, to supervise a remodeling project, and did not return to Chicago until September 16. Because Gacy is known to have been in another state at the time Gilroy was last seen, this is cited to support Gacy's claim of assistance from one or more accomplices in several homicides. Ten days after Gilroy was last seen, 19-year-old former U.S. Marine John Mowery disappeared after leaving his mother's house to walk to his apartment. Gacy strangled Mowery and buried his body beneath the master bedroom.

On October 17, 21-year-old Minnesota native Russell Nelson disappeared; he was last seen outside a Chicago bar. Nelson was looking for contracting work. Gacy murdered him and buried him beneath the guest bedroom. Less than four weeks later, Gacy murdered a 16-year-old Kalamazoo teenager named Robert Winch and buried him in the crawl space. On November 18, 20-year-old father-of-one Tommy Boling disappeared after leaving a Chicago bar.

Three weeks after the murder of Tommy Boling, on December 9, a 19-year-old U.S. Marine, David Talsma, disappeared after informing his mother he was to attend a rock concert in Hammond, Indiana. Gacy strangled Talsma with a ligature and buried him in the crawl space, close to the body of John Mowery.

On December 30, Gacy abducted 19-year-old college student Robert Donnelly from a Chicago bus stop at gunpoint. Gacy drove him to his home, where he raped, tortured, and repeatedly dunked Donnelly's head into a bathtub until he passed out. Gacy taunted him with statements such as, "Aren't we playing fun games tonight?" Donnelly later testified at Gacy's trial that he was in such pain that he asked Gacy to kill him. Gacy replied "I'm getting 'round to it." After several hours, Gacy drove Donnelly to his workplace and released him, warning him that if he complained to police, they would not believe him.

1978
Donnelly reported the assault, and police questioned Gacy on January 6, 1978. Gacy admitted to having had a "slave-sex" relationship with Donnelly, but insisted everything was consensual, adding that he "didn't pay the kid" the money he had promised him. The police believed him and filed no charges. The following month, Gacy killed 19-year-old William Kindred, who disappeared on February 16 after telling his fiancée, who knew Gacy, that he was to spend the evening in a bar. Kindred was the final victim Gacy buried in his crawl space.

On March 21, Gacy lured 26-year-old Jeffrey Rignall into his car. Shortly after Rignall entered the car, Gacy chloroformed him and drove him to his house, where his arms and head were restrained in a pillory device affixed to the ceiling and his feet locked into another device. Gacy explained to Rignall he had complete control over him and that he intended to do whatever he wanted to him, when he wanted, and how he wanted. He then raped and tortured Rignall with various instruments including lit candles and whips and repeatedly chloroformed him into unconsciousness. Gacy then drove Rignall to Chicago's Lincoln Park, where he was dumped, unconscious but alive.

Rignall managed to stagger to his girlfriend's apartment. Police were informed of the assault but did not investigate Gacy. Rignall was able to recall, through the haze of that night, the Oldsmobile, the Kennedy Expressway and particular side streets. He and two friends staked out the Cumberland exit of the Expressway and, in April, Rignall saw the Oldsmobile, which he and his friends followed to 8213 West Summerdale. Police obtained an arrest warrant, and Gacy was arrested on July 15. He faced trial for assault and battery against Rignall at the time of his arrest.

By mid-1978, the crawl space had no room for further bodies. Gacy later confessed to police that he considered stowing bodies in his attic initially, but had been worried about complications arising from "leakage". Therefore, he chose to dispose of his victims off the I-55 bridge into the Des Plaines River. Gacy stated he had thrown five bodies into this river in 1978, one of which he believed had landed on a passing barge; only four bodies were ever found.

The first known victim thrown from the I-55 bridge into the Des Plaines River was 20-year-old Timothy O'Rourke. He was murdered in mid-June after leaving his Dover Street apartment to purchase cigarettes. Shortly before his disappearance, O'Rourke had told his roommate a contractor on the Northwest Side had offered him a job.

On November 4, Gacy killed 19-year-old Frank Landingin. He was last seen alive by his father walking along Foster Avenue; his naked body was found close to an inlet in the Des Plaines River by two duck hunters in Channahon on November 12. On November 24, a 20-year-old Elmwood Park resident, James Mazzara, disappeared after sharing Thanksgiving dinner with his family. Mazzara had informed his sister the day prior to his disappearance that he was working in the construction industry and "doing all right". He was last seen alive walking in the direction of Bughouse Square, carrying a suitcase.

Murder of Robert Piest

On the afternoon of December 11, 1978, Gacy visited the Nisson Pharmacy in Des Plaines, to discuss a potential remodeling deal with the store owner, Phil Torf. While he was within earshot of 15-year-old part-time employee Robert Piest, Gacy mentioned his firm often hired teenage boys at a starting wage of $5 per hour—almost double the pay Piest earned at the pharmacy.

Shortly after Gacy left the pharmacy, Piest's mother arrived at the store to drive her son home so the family could celebrate her birthday together. Piest asked his mother to wait, adding that "some contractor wants to talk to me about a job". He left the store at 9:00 p.m., promising to return shortly.

Piest was murdered shortly after 10:00 p.m. at Gacy's home. Gacy later stated that at his house, he gave Piest a soft drink before asking whether there was anything he "wouldn't do for the right price", to which Piest replied that he did not mind working hard. In response, Gacy stated "good money" could be earned by hustling, although Piest was dismissive. Gacy then duped Piest into donning handcuffs before saying, "I'm going to rape you, and you can't do anything about it" as Piest began weeping.

Gacy's subsequent statements regarding the events to unfold varied, although in one of his initial statements, he claimed Piest failed to resist as he removed the boy's trousers. He also stated that as he placed the rope around Piest's neck, the boy was "crying, scared". Gacy admitted to having received a phone call from a business acquaintance as Piest lay dying, suffocating on his bedroom floor.

Investigation
When Piest failed to return, his family filed a missing person report with the Des Plaines police. Torf named Gacy as the contractor Piest had most likely left the store to talk to about a job. Lieutenant Joseph Kozenczak, whose son attended Maine West High School like Piest, chose to investigate Gacy further. Having spoken with Piest's mother on the morning of December 12, Kozenczak became convinced Piest had not run away from home. A routine check of Gacy's criminal background revealed that he had an outstanding battery charge against him in Chicago and had served a prison sentence in Iowa for the sodomy of a 15-year-old boy.

Kozenczak and two Des Plaines police officers visited Gacy at his home the following evening. Gacy indicated he had seen two youths working at the pharmacy and that he had asked one of them—whom he believed to be Piest—whether there were any remodeling materials behind the store. He was adamant, however, that he had not offered Piest a job, and had only returned to the pharmacy shortly after 8:00 p.m. as he had left his appointment book at the store. Gacy promised to come to the station later that evening to make a statement confirming this, indicating he was unable to do so at that moment as his uncle had just died. When questioned as to how soon he could come to the police station, he responded, "You guys are very rude. Don't you have any respect for the dead?"

At 3:20 a.m., Gacy arrived at the police station covered in mud, claiming he had been involved in a car accident. On returning to the police station later that day, Gacy denied any involvement in Piest's disappearance and repeated that he had not offered him a job. When asked why he had returned to the pharmacy, Gacy reiterated that he had done so in response to a phone call from Torf informing him he had left his appointment book at the store. Detectives had already spoken with Torf, who denied calling Gacy. At the request of detectives, Gacy prepared a written statement detailing his movements on December 11.

First search warrant
Suspecting Gacy might be holding Piest against his will at his home, Des Plaines police obtained a warrant to search Gacy's house on December 13. This search of Gacy's property revealed several suspicious items, including several police badges and a 6mm Brevettata starter pistol inside an office drawer, and a syringe and hypodermic needle inside a cabinet in Gacy's bathroom. Investigators also found handcuffs, several books on homosexuality and pederasty with titles such as The Great White Swallow and Pretty Boys Must Die, seven pornographic films, capsules of amyl nitrite, and an  dildo in Gacy's bedroom. A  two-by-four with two holes drilled into each end, bottles of Valium and atropine, and several driver's licenses were found in the northwest bedroom. A blue hooded parka was found atop a tool box inside the laundry room, and underwear too small to fit Gacy was located inside a bathroom closet.

In the northwest bedroom, investigators found a class of 1975 Maine West High School ring engraved with the initials J.A.S. Investigators also recovered a Nisson Pharmacy photo receipt from a trash can, alongside a  section of nylon rope.

Surveillance
The Des Plaines police confiscated Gacy's Oldsmobile and other PDM work vehicles. Police assigned two alternate two-man surveillance teams to monitor Gacy on a rotational twelve-hour basis as they continued their investigation into his background and potential involvement in Piest's disappearance. These surveillance teams consisted of officers Mike Albrecht and David Hachmeister, and Ronald Robinson and Robert Schultz. The following day, investigators received a phone call from Michael Rossi, who informed the investigators of Gregory Godzik's disappearance and the fact that another PDM employee, Charles Hattula, had been found drowned in an Illinois river earlier that year.

On December 15, Des Plaines investigators obtained further details of Gacy's battery charge, learning the complainant, Jeffrey Rignall, had reported that Gacy had lured him into his car, then chloroformed, raped and tortured him before dumping him, with severe chest and facial burns and rectal bleeding, in Lincoln Park the following morning. In an interview with Gacy's former wife the same day, they learned of the disappearance of John Butkovich. The same day, the Maine West High School ring was traced to a John Alan Szyc. An interview with Szyc's mother revealed that several items from her son's apartment were also missing, including a Motorola TV set.

By December 16, Gacy was becoming affable with the surveillance detectives, regularly inviting them to join him for meals in restaurants and occasionally for drinks in bars or at his home. He repeatedly denied that he had anything to do with Piest's disappearance and accused the officers of harassing him because of his political connections or because of his recreational drug use. Knowing these officers were unlikely to arrest him on anything trivial, he taunted them by flouting traffic laws and succeeded in losing his pursuers more than once. That afternoon, Cram consented to a police interview, in which he described Gacy's hard-working lifestyle, and "open-minded" attitude about sex between men. Cram also revealed that, because of his poor timekeeping, Gacy had once given him a watch, explaining he got it "from a dead person".

Investigators conducted a formal interview of Rossi on December 17. He informed them Gacy had sold Szyc's vehicle to him, explaining that he had bought the car from Szyc because he needed money to move to California. A further examination of Gacy's Oldsmobile was conducted on this date. In the course of examining the trunk of the car, investigators discovered a small cluster of fibers they suspected to be human hair. That evening, officers conducted a test using three trained German shepherd search dogs to determine whether Piest had been present in any of Gacy's vehicles. One dog approached Gacy's Oldsmobile and lay on the passenger seat in what the dog's handler informed investigators was a "death reaction", indicating Piest's body had been present in the vehicle.

That evening, Gacy invited detectives Albrecht and Hachmeister to a restaurant for a meal. In the early hours of December 18, he invited them into another restaurant where, over breakfast, he talked of his business, his marriages and his activities as a registered clown. At one point during the conversation, Gacy remarked: "You know ... clowns can get away with murder."

Civil suit
By December 18, Gacy was beginning to display signs of strain from the constant surveillance: he was unshaven, looked tired, appeared anxious and was drinking heavily. That afternoon, he drove to his lawyers' office to prepare a $750,000 civil suit against the Des Plaines police, demanding that they cease their surveillance. The same day, the serial number of the Nisson Pharmacy photo receipt found in Gacy's kitchen was traced to 17-year-old Kimberly Byers, a colleague of Piest at Nisson Pharmacy. Byers admitted, when contacted in person the following day, that she had worn the jacket on December 11 to shield herself from the cold. She had placed the receipt in the parka pocket just before she gave the coat to Piest as he left the store, claiming a contractor wanted to speak with him. This statement contradicted Gacy's previous statements that he had had no contact with Robert Piest on the evening of December 11.

Second search warrant
The same evening, Rossi was interviewed a second time. This time he was more cooperative. He informed detectives that in the summer of 1977, at Gacy's behest, he had spread ten bags of lime in the crawl space of Gacy's house.

On December 19, investigators began compiling evidence for a second search warrant for Gacy's house. The same day, Gacy's lawyers filed the civil suit against the Des Plaines police. The hearing for the suit was scheduled for December 22. That afternoon, Gacy invited the surveillance detectives inside his house again. As officer Robinson distracted Gacy with conversation, officer Schultz walked into Gacy's bedroom in an unsuccessful attempt to write down the serial number of the Motorola TV set they suspected belonged to John Szyc. While flushing Gacy's toilet, the officer noticed a smell he suspected could be that of rotting corpses emanating from a heating duct. The officers who had searched Gacy's house previously had failed to notice this, as the house had been cold.

Investigators interviewed both Cram and Rossi on December 20. Rossi had agreed to be interviewed in relation to his possible links with John Szyc as well as the disappearance of Robert Piest. When questioned by Kozenczak as to where he believed Gacy had concealed Piest's body, Rossi replied Gacy may have placed the body in the crawl space, adding that he thought Szyc's car was stolen. Rossi agreed to submit to a polygraph test. He denied any involvement in Piest's disappearance, also denying any knowledge of his whereabouts. He soon refused to continue the questioning, and Rossi's "erratic and inconsistent" responses to questions while attached to the polygraph machine rendered Kozenczak "unable to render a definite opinion" as to the truthfulness of his answers. Rossi did, however, further discuss the trench digging he did in the crawl space and remarked on Gacy's insistence that he not deviate from where he was instructed to dig.

Cram informed investigators of Gacy's attempts to rape him in 1976. He stated that after he and Gacy had returned to his home after the December 13 search of his property, Gacy had turned pale after seeing a clod of mud on his carpet which he suspected had come from his crawl space. Cram said Gacy had grabbed a flashlight and immediately entered the crawl space to look for evidence of digging. When asked whether he had been to the crawl space, Cram replied he had once been asked by Gacy to spread lime down there and had also dug trenches, which Gacy had explained were for drainage pipes.

Confession
On the evening of December 20, Gacy drove to his lawyers' office in Park Ridge to attend a scheduled meeting, ostensibly to discuss the progress of his civil suit. On his arrival Gacy appeared disheveled and immediately asked for an alcoholic drink, whereupon Sam Amirante fetched a bottle of whiskey from his car. On his return, Amirante asked Gacy what he had to discuss with them. Gacy picked up a copy of the Daily Herald from Amirante's desk, pointed to a front-page article covering the disappearance of Robert Piest and said, "This boy is dead. He's dead. He's in a river."

Gacy then proceeded to give a rambling confession that ran into the early hours of the following morning. He began by informing Amirante and Stevens he had "been the judge ... jury and executioner of many, many people", and that he now wanted to be the same for himself. He said he had murdered "at least thirty" victims, most of whom he had buried in his crawl space, and had disposed of five other bodies in the Des Plaines River. Gacy dismissed his victims as "male prostitutes", "hustlers" and "liars" to whom he gave "the rope trick", adding he sometimes awoke to find "dead, strangled kids" on his floor, with their hands cuffed behind their back. He had buried their bodies in his crawl space as he believed they were his property.

As a result of the alcohol he had consumed, Gacy fell asleep midway through his confession. Amirante immediately arranged a psychiatric appointment for Gacy at 9:00 a.m. that morning. On awakening several hours later, Gacy shook his head when informed by Amirante he had confessed to killing approximately 30 people, saying, "Well, I can't think about this right now. I've got things to do." Ignoring his lawyers' advice regarding his scheduled appointment, Gacy left their office to attend to the needs of his business.

Gacy later recollected his memories of his final day of freedom as being "hazy", adding he knew his arrest was inevitable and that he intended to visit his friends and say his final farewells. After leaving his lawyers' office, Gacy drove to a gas station where, in the course of filling his rental car, he handed a small bag of cannabis to the attendant, who immediately handed the bag to the surveillance officers, adding that Gacy had told him, "The end is coming (for me). These guys are going to kill me." Gacy then drove to the home of a fellow contractor and friend, Ronald Rhode. Gacy hugged Rhode before bursting into tears and saying, "I've been a bad boy. I killed thirty people, give or take a few." Gacy left Rhode and drove to Cram's home to meet with Cram and Rossi. As he drove along the expressway, the surveillance officers noted he was holding a rosary to his chin, praying while he drove.

After talking with Cram and Rossi, Gacy had Cram drive him to a scheduled meeting with lawyer Leroy Stevens on the Northwest Side. As Gacy spoke with Stevens, Cram informed the surveillance officers that Gacy had told him and Rossi that he had confessed to over 30 murders with his lawyers the previous evening. Gacy then had Cram drive him to Maryhill Cemetery, where his father was buried.

As Gacy drove to various locations that morning, police outlined the formal draft of their second search warrant, specifically to search for the body of Robert Piest in the crawl space. On hearing from the surveillance detectives that, in light of his erratic behavior, Gacy might be about to commit suicide, police decided to arrest him on a charge of possession and distribution of cannabis in order to hold him in custody, as the formal request for a second search warrant was presented. At 4:30 p.m. on December 21, the eve of the hearing of Gacy's civil suit, Judge Marvin J. Peters granted the request for a second search warrant. After police informed Gacy of their intentions to search his crawl space for the body of Piest, Gacy denied the teenager was buried there, but confessed to having killed in self-defense a young man whose body was buried under his garage.

Armed with the signed search warrant, police and evidence technicians drove to Gacy's home. On their arrival, officers found Gacy had unplugged his sump pump, flooding the crawl space with water; to clear it, they simply replaced the plug and waited for the water to drain. After it had done so, evidence technician Daniel Genty entered the  crawl space, crawled to the southwest area and began digging. Within minutes, he had uncovered putrefied flesh and a human arm bone. Genty immediately shouted to the investigators that they could charge Gacy with murder, adding, "I think this place is full of kids." A police photographer then dug in the northeast corner of the crawl space, uncovering a patella. The two then began digging in the southeast corner, uncovering two lower leg bones.

The victims were too decomposed to be Piest. As the body discovered in the northeast corner was later unearthed, a crime scene technician discovered the skull of a second victim alongside this body. Later excavations of the feet of this second victim revealed a further skull beneath the body. Because of this, technicians returned to the trench where the first body was unearthed, discovering the rib cage of a fourth victim within the crawl space, confirming the scale of the murders.

Arrest
After being informed that the police had found human remains in his crawl space and that he would now face murder charges, Gacy told officers he wanted to "clear the air", adding he had known his arrest was inevitable since the previous evening, which he had spent on the couch in his lawyers' office.

In the early morning hours of December 22, and in the presence of his lawyers, Gacy provided a formal statement in which he confessed to murdering approximately 30 young males—all of whom he claimed had entered his house willingly. Some victims were referred to by name, but Gacy claimed not to know or remember most of the names. He claimed all were teenage male runaways or male prostitutes, the majority of whom he had buried in his crawl space. Gacy claimed to have dug only five of the victims' graves in this location and had his employees (including Gregory Godzik) dig the remaining trenches so that he would "have graves available". One victim hailed from Round Lake; another had been a Michigan native. When shown a driver's license issued to a Robert Hasten which had been found on his property, Gacy claimed not to know him but admitted that this license had been in the possession of one of his victims. In January 1979, he had planned to conceal the corpses even further by covering the entire crawl space with concrete.

When questioned specifically about Piest, Gacy confessed to luring him to his house and strangling him on the evening of December 11. He also admitted to having slept alongside Piest's body that evening, before disposing of the corpse in the Des Plaines River in the early hours of December 13. On his way to the police station, he had been in a minor traffic accident after disposing of Piest. His vehicle had slid off an ice-covered road and had to be towed from its location.

Accompanied by police, his lawyers, and his older sister, Gacy was driven to the I-55 bridge on December 23 to pinpoint the precise spot where he confessed to having thrown the body of Robert Piest and four other victims into the Des Plaines River. Gacy was then taken to his house and instructed to mark his garage floor with orange spray paint to show where he had buried the individual he had supposedly killed in self-defense, whom he named as John Butkovich.

Search for victims

Crawl space

To assist officers in their search for the victims buried beneath his house, during his confession, Gacy drew a rough diagram of his basement on a phone message sheet to indicate where their bodies were buried. Twenty-six bodies were unearthed from Gacy's crawl space over the next week; three more were also unearthed elsewhere on his property.

Cook County medical examiner Robert Stein supervised the exhumations. Each victim unearthed from the crawl space was placed in a body bag, which was placed near the front door awaiting transportation to the mortuary.

The crawl space was marked in sections and each body was given an identifying number. The first body recovered from the crawl space was assigned a marker denoting the victim as Body 1. Gacy had buried this victim in the northeast section of the crawl space directly beneath the room he used as his office. No cause of death could be determined.

The body of John Butkovich was labelled as Body 2. On December 23, investigators returned to unearth the three corpses which had been buried in the same trench as Body 1. Body 3 was buried in the crawl space directly above Body 4. Alongside them, Body 5 was buried directly beneath Body 1. This victim was buried 36 inches below the surface of the soil, indicating he was the first decedent to be buried in this common grave.

The search for victims was postponed temporarily over Christmas. Four more bodies were unearthed on December 26. Bodies number 6 and 7 were buried in the same grave. Body 7 was found in a fetal position. A cloth gag was found in the mouth, leading investigators to conclude this victim most likely died of asphyxiation. Body 8 was found with the tourniquet used to strangle him still knotted around his neck. Body 9 was found beneath a layer of concrete and was found to have several stab wounds to the ribs and sternum, suggesting he was Gacy's first victim.

On December 27, eight more bodies were discovered. Body 10 was buried face upwards, parallel to the wall of the crawl space directly beneath the entrance to Gacy's home. Both Body 11 and Body 12 were found face downwards with a ligature around their necks and both were buried beside each other in the center of the crawl space, directly beneath the hallway. Body 13 was found beneath the spare bedroom; Bodies 14 and 15 were recovered from a common grave diagonal to Body 10. Both 14 and 15 were found with their head and upper torsos inside separate plastic bags. Body 16 was found close to Body 13, although in a separate trench further north of the south wall. This victim was found with a cloth rag lodged deep in his throat, causing him to die of suffocation. The seventeenth victim was found with a ligature around his neck.

The following day, four more bodies were exhumed. Body 19 was buried directly beneath Gacy's master bedroom, perpendicular to Body 18, which was located beneath the spare bedroom, and found with a ligature around the neck. Body 20 was buried in the northwest corner of the crawl space perpendicular to Body 19.

By December 29, six more bodies were unearthed. Bodies 22, 23, 24, and 26 were buried in a common grave located beneath Gacy's kitchen and laundry room, with Body 25 located beneath Gacy's bathroom. Body 22 was found directly beneath Gacy's kitchen with a section of cloth-like material lodged in his throat. Two socks were recovered from the pelvic region. This victim was buried directly beneath Body 21 (recovered the previous day). The bones of victims 23 and 24 were commingled together, and a section of cloth was found inside the mouth of Bodies 24 and 26. Body 25 was found beneath Gacy's bathroom with a section of cloth lodged in the throat. The final victim recovered from the crawl space was also found beneath the bathroom, buried ten inches below the surface of the soil. This victim was found to have a section of cloth lodged deep in his throat.

Operations were suspended due to the Chicago Blizzard of 1979, but resumed in March despite Gacy's insistence that all the buried victims had been found. On March 16, Body 29 was found beneath the dining room floor.

All the victims discovered at 8213 W. Summerdale were in an advanced state of decomposition. Dental records and X-ray charts helped Stein identify the remains. Twenty-three victims were identified via dental records, with two further victims identified via skeletal trauma. These identifications were also supported with personal artifacts found in Gacy's home.

The head and upper torso of several bodies unearthed beneath Gacy's property had been placed into plastic bags. Several were also found with a rope still around their necks. In some cases, bodies were found with foreign objects such as prescription bottles lodged into their pelvic region, the position of which indicated the items had been thrust into the victims' anus.

Stein concluded 12 victims recovered from Gacy's property died not of strangulation, but of asphyxiation. Gacy's vacant house was demolished in April 1979.

Des Plaines River

In January 1979, this victim was identified using fingerprint records and a distinctive tattoo on his left biceps reading "Tim Lee" (an homage to Bruce Lee) as Timothy O'Rourke. An autopsy was unable to rule out strangulation as the cause of death. This victim was numbered 31. Following Gacy's arrest, investigators discovered he was a further victim.

Frank Landingin's cause of death was certified at autopsy as suffocation through his own underwear being lodged down his throat, plugging his airway and effectively causing him to drown in his own vomit. His body was also identified via fingerprint records. A bond slip issued to Landingin the day before his death was found at Gacy's home; he was assigned victim number 32.

On December 28, one further body linked to Gacy was found  from the I-55 bridge. This victim was identified as James Mazzara, whom Gacy confessed to having murdered shortly after Thanksgiving. Mazzara had been strangled with a ligature.

On April 9, 1979, a man walking along a Grundy County towpath discovered a decomposed body entangled in exposed roots on the edge of the Des Plaines River. The body was identified via dental records as being that of Robert Piest the same evening. A subsequent autopsy revealed that three wads of "paper-like material" had been shoved down his throat while he was still alive, causing him to suffocate.

Trial
Gacy was brought to trial on February 6, 1980, charged with 33 murders. He was tried in Cook County, Illinois, before Judge Louis Garippo; the jury was selected from Rockford, because of extensive press coverage in Cook County.

At the request of his defense counsel, Gacy spent over three hundred hours with doctors at the Menard Correctional Center in Chester in the year before his trial. He underwent a variety of psychological tests before a panel of psychiatrists to determine whether he was mentally competent to stand trial. Gacy attempted to convince the doctors that he had multiple personality disorder. He claimed to have four personalities: the hard-working, civic-minded contractor, the clown, the active politician, and a policeman called Jack Hanley, whom he referred to as "Bad Jack". When Gacy had confessed to police, he claimed to be relaying the crimes of Jack, who detested homosexuality and who viewed male prostitutes as "weak, stupid and degraded scum". His lawyers opted to have Gacy plead not guilty by reason of insanity to the charges against him. Presenting Gacy as a Jekyll-and-Hyde character, the defense produced several psychiatric experts who had examined Gacy. Three psychiatric experts at Gacy's trial testified they found him to be a paranoid schizophrenic with multiple personalities.

The prosecutors presented the case that Gacy was sane and in full control of his actions. To support this contention, they produced several witnesses to testify to the premeditation of Gacy's actions and the efforts he took to escape detection. Those doctors refuted the defense doctors' claims of multiple personalities and insanity. Cram and Rossi testified that Gacy had made them dig drainage trenches and spread bags of lime in his crawl space. Both said Gacy looked periodically into the crawl space to ensure they and other employees they supervised did not deviate from the precise locations he had marked.

On February 18, Robert Stein testified that all the bodies recovered from Gacy's property were "markedly decomposed [and] putrefied, skeletalized remains", and that of all the autopsies he performed, thirteen victims had died of asphyxiation, six of ligature strangulation, one of multiple stab wounds to the chest and ten in undetermined ways. When Gacy's defense team suggested that all 33 deaths were caused by accidental erotic asphyxia, Stein called this highly improbable.

Jeffrey Rignall testified on behalf of the defense on February 21. Recounting his ordeal, Rignall wept repeatedly while describing Gacy's torture of him in March 1978. Asked whether Gacy appreciated the criminality of his actions, Rignall said he believed that Gacy was unable to conform his actions to the law's expectations because of the "beastly and animalistic ways he attacked me". During specific cross-examination relating to the torture, Rignall vomited and was excused from further testimony.

On February 29, Donald Voorhees, whom Gacy sexually assaulted in 1967, testified to his ordeal at Gacy's hands and his subsequent attempts to dissuade him from testifying by paying another youth to spray Mace in his face and beat him. Voorhees felt unable to testify but did briefly attempt to do so before being asked to step down.

Robert Donnelly testified the week after Voorhees, recounting his ordeal at Gacy's hands in December 1977. Donnelly was visibly distressed as he recalled the abuse he endured and came close to breaking down several times. As Donnelly testified, Gacy repeatedly laughed at him, but Donnelly finished his testimony. During Donnelly's cross-examination, one of Gacy's defense attorneys, Robert Motta, attempted to discredit his testimony, but Donnelly did not waver from his testimony of what had occurred.

During the fifth week of the trial, Gacy wrote a personal letter to Judge Garippo requesting a mistrial for reasons including that he did not approve of his lawyers' insanity plea; that his lawyers had not allowed him to take the witness stand (as he had wanted to do); that his defense had not called enough medical witnesses, and that the police were lying with regard to verbal statements he had allegedly made to detectives after his arrest and that, in any event, the statements were "self-serving" for use by the prosecution. Judge Garippo addressed Gacy's letter by informing him that both counsels had not been denied the opportunity or funds to summon expert witnesses to testify, and that, under the law, he had the choice whether he wished to testify, and was free to indicate as much to the judge if he wished to do so.

Closing arguments
On March 11, final arguments by both prosecution and defense attorneys began; they concluded the following day. Prosecuting attorney Terry Sullivan spoke first, outlining Gacy's history of abusing youths, the testimony of his efforts to avoid detection and describing his surviving victims—Voorhees and Donnelly—as "living dead". Referring to Gacy as the "worst of all murderers", Sullivan stated, "John Gacy has accounted for more human devastation than many earthly catastrophes, but one must tremble. I tremble when thinking about just how close he came to getting away with it all."

After the state's four-hour closing, counsel Sam Amirante spoke for the defense. Amirante argued against the testimony delivered by the doctors who had testified for the prosecution, repeatedly citing the testimony of the four psychiatrists and psychologists who had testified on behalf of the defense. Amirante also accused Sullivan of scarcely referring to the evidence presented throughout the trial in his own closing argument, and of arousing hatred against his client. The defense lawyer attempted to portray Gacy as a "man driven by compulsions he was unable to control", contending the State had not met their burden of proving Gacy sane beyond a reasonable doubt.

In support of these arguments, the defense referred to the testimony of the doctors who had appeared for the defense, in addition to defense witnesses such as Jeffrey Rignall and a former business associate of Gacy's named Mickel Ried—both of whom had testified to their belief that Gacy had been unable to control his actions. Amirante then urged the jury to put aside any prejudice they held against his client and asked they deliver a verdict of not guilty by reason of insanity, adding that Gacy was a danger to both himself and to others, and that studying his psychology and behavior would be of benefit to science.

On the morning of March 12, William Kunkle continued to argue for the prosecution. Kunkle referred to the defense's contention of insanity as "a sham", arguing that the facts of the case demonstrated Gacy's ability to think logically and control his actions. Kunkle also referred to the testimony of one of the doctors who had examined Gacy in 1968 and had concluded he was an antisocial personality, capable of committing crimes without remorse and unlikely to benefit from social or psychiatric treatment, stating that had the recommendations of this doctor been heeded, Gacy would not have been freed.

At the close of his argument, Kunkle removed photos of Gacy's 22 identified victims from a display board and asked the jury not to show sympathy but to "show justice". Kunkle then asked the jury to "show the same sympathy this man showed when he took these lives and put them there!" before throwing the stack of photos into the opening of the trap door from Gacy's crawl space, which had been introduced as evidence and was on display in the courtroom. After Kunkle had finished his testimony, the jury retired to consider their verdict.

The jury deliberated for one hour and fifty minutes before announcing they had reached their verdicts: Gacy was found guilty of 33 charges of murder; he was also found guilty of sexual assault and taking indecent liberties with a child; both convictions in reference to Robert Piest. At the time, his conviction for 33 murders was the most for which any person in U.S. history had been convicted.

In the sentencing phase of the trial, the jury deliberated for more than two hours before sentencing Gacy to death for each murder committed after the Illinois statute on capital punishment came into effect in June 1977. His execution was set for June 2, 1980.

Death row
On being sentenced, Gacy was transferred to the Menard Correctional Center, where he remained incarcerated on death row for 14 years.

Before his trial, Gacy initiated contact with WLS-TV journalist Russ Ewing, to whom he granted numerous interviews between 1979 and 1981. Ewing later collaborated with author Tim Cahill to publish the book Buried Dreams. The information Gacy divulged to Ewing regarding the circumstances of his first murder would prove instrumental in establishing the identity of his first victim.

On February 15, 1983, Henry Brisbon, a fellow death row inmate known as the I-57 killer, stabbed Gacy in the upper arm with a sharpened wire as Gacy was participating in a voluntary work program. A second death row inmate injured in the attack, William Jones, received a superficial stab wound to the head. Both received treatment in the prison hospital for their wounds.

Appeals
After his incarceration, Gacy read numerous law books and filed voluminous motions and appeals, although he did not prevail in any of them. His appeals related to issues such as the validity of the first search warrant granted to the Des Plaines police on December 13, 1978, and his objection to his lawyers' insanity plea defense at his trial. Gacy also contended that, although he had "some knowledge" of five of the murders (those of McCoy, Butkovich, Godzik, Szyc and Piest), the other 28 murders had been committed by employees who had keys to his house while he was away on business trips.

In mid-1984, the Supreme Court of Illinois upheld Gacy's conviction and ordered his execution by lethal injection on November 14. Gacy filed an appeal against this decision, which was denied by the Supreme Court of the United States on March 4, 1985. The following year, Gacy filed a further post-conviction petition, seeking a new trial. His then-defense lawyer, Richard Kling, argued that Gacy had been provided with ineffective legal counsel at his 1980 trial. This post-conviction petition was dismissed on September 11, 1986.

Gacy appealed the 1985 decision that he be executed. The Illinois Supreme Court upheld his conviction on September 29, 1988, setting a new execution date of January 11, 1989.

After the U.S. Supreme Court denied Gacy's final appeal in October 1993, the Illinois Supreme Court formally set an execution date for May 10, 1994.

Execution

On the morning of May 9, 1994, Gacy was transferred from the Menard Correctional Center to Stateville Correctional Center in Crest Hill to be executed. That afternoon, he was allowed a private picnic on the prison grounds with his family. For his last meal, Gacy ordered a bucket of KFC, a dozen fried shrimp, french fries, fresh strawberries and a Diet Coke. That evening, he observed prayer with a Catholic priest, from whom he received the last rites, before being escorted to the Stateville execution chamber to receive a lethal injection.

Before the execution began, the chemicals used to effect the execution solidified unexpectedly, clogging the IV tube used to administer the chemicals into Gacy's arm, complicating the procedure. Blinds covering the window through which witnesses observed the execution were drawn. The execution team replaced the clogged tube. After ten minutes, the blinds were reopened, and the execution resumed. The entire procedure took 18 minutes. Anesthesiologists blamed the problem on the prison officials' inexperience at conducting an execution, saying that had correct execution procedures been followed, the complications would never have occurred. This error apparently led to Illinois' adopting an alternative method of lethal injection. On this subject, one prosecutor at Gacy's trial, William Kunkle, said, "He got a much easier death than any of his victims."

According to published reports, Gacy was a diagnosed psychopath who did not express any remorse for his crimes. His final statement to his lawyer before his execution was that killing him would not compensate for the loss of others, and that the state was murdering him. His final spoken words were reported to be "Kiss my ass", although prosecutor William Kunkle stated in 2020 that these words were spoken to a prison official, and were not part of any official statement prior to Gacy's execution.

In the hours leading up to Gacy's execution, a crowd estimated at over 1,000 gathered outside the correctional center; a vocal majority were in favor of the execution, although a small number of anti-death penalty protesters were also present. Some of those in favor of the execution wore T-shirts hearkening to Gacy's previous community services as a clown and bearing satirical slogans such as "No tears for the clown". The anti-death penalty protesters present observed a silent candlelight vigil.

After Gacy's death was confirmed at 12:58 a.m. on May 10, 1994, his brain was removed. It is in the possession of Helen Morrison, a witness for the defense at Gacy's trial, who has interviewed Gacy and other serial killers in an attempt to isolate common personality traits of violent sociopaths. His body was cremated.

Victims

Identified victims 
Only 28 of Gacy's victims have been conclusively identified. Of these, the youngest were Samuel Stapleton and Michael Marino, both 14; the eldest were Francis Alexander and Russell Nelson, both 21. Five victims have never been identified.

The first victims to be identified were John Butkovich (Body 2), John Szyc (Body 3), and Gregory Godzik (Body 4). Dental records confirmed their identities on December 29, 1978. The thirty-third victim linked to Gacy, James Mazzara, was identified the following day. The twenty-third victim exhumed from Gacy's property was identified as Rick Johnston on January 1, 1979.

Four further victims were identified on January 6, 1979. Body 18 was identified as Michael Bonnin and Body 25 as Robert Gilroy. The first victim exhumed from the crawl space was identified as Jon Prestidge, and the victim labelled Body 16 as Russell Nelson. A fishing license issued to Bonnin had been found in Gacy's home. Three days later, the victim recovered from the Des Plaines River on June 30, 1978, was identified as Timothy O'Rourke. On January 27, dental charts were used to identify Body 20 as John Mowery. Two days later, Body 8 was identified as Matthew Bowman.

Two months later, on March 17, 1979, the twenty-second victim recovered from Gacy's property was identified using dental records as William Carroll. The following month, the identity of the seventh victim was confirmed using X-ray records as Randall Reffett, and on May 21, dental records confirmed that Body 27 was William Kindred.

On September 11, 1979, Bodies 11 and 12 were identified as Robert Winch and Tommy Boling, respectively. Winch was identified via X-ray records of a distinctive healed bone fracture. A distinctive brown "tiger's eye" metal buckle with black striping belonging to Winch was also found alongside his body.

Using dental records, the sixth victim exhumed from Gacy's property was identified on November 14, 1979, as Samuel Stapleton. On November 16, Body 17 was identified as David Talsma using radiology images of a healed fracture of the left scapula. Two days later, the final victim recovered from Gacy's property, Body 29, was identified as Darrell Samson.

On March 29, 1980, Bodies 14 and 15 were identified using dental records and radiology images as those of Michael Marino and Kenneth Parker. Their identities were confirmed too late to include among the victims identified before Gacy's trial.

In May 1986, the ninth victim exhumed from Gacy's property was identified as Timothy Jack McCoy, Gacy's first victim. Dental records and a distinctive yellow belt buckle engraved with a Ford Model A car assisted with his identification.

Renewed efforts 
In October 2011, Cook County sheriff Thomas Dart announced that investigators, having obtained full DNA profiles from each of the unidentified victims, were to renew their efforts to identify them. At a press conference held to announce this, Sheriff Dart stated investigators are actively seeking DNA samples from individuals across the United States related to any male missing between 1970 and 1979.

Results of tests conducted thus far have confirmed the identification of three victims, ruled out the possibility of numerous other missing youths as being victims of Gacy, and solved four unrelated cold cases dating between 1972 and 1979.

In November 2011, the victim previously known as Body 19 was identified through DNA testing as William Bundy. Shortly after Gacy's arrest, Bundy's family had contacted his dentist in the hope of submitting his dental records for comparison with the unidentified bodies, but the records had been destroyed after his dentist had retired. In July 2017, 16-year-old James Haakenson, previously known as Body 24, was also identified as a victim using DNA testing. The most recent victim to be identified is 21-year-old Francis Wayne Alexander, previously known as Body 5. Alexander was identified via forensic genealogy in October 2021. He had not been reported missing by his family, who believed he had relocated from Chicago to California shortly after his final contact with his mother in November 1976.

Summary

Unidentified victims
In the fall of 1979, forensic expert Betty Pat Gatliff used the skulls of the remaining unidentified victims to create facial reconstructions.

Based on Gacy's confession, the location of the victims buried in the crawl space, and forensic analysis, police determined the most likely dates for when his unidentified victims were killed.

 January 3, 1972 – July 31, 1975. Body 28. Backyard. Male aged 14–18.
 June 13 – August 5, 1976. Body 26. Crawl space. Male aged 23–30.
 August 6 – October 5, 1976. Body 13. Crawl space. Male aged 17–22.
 August 6 – October 24, 1976. Body 21. Crawl space. Male aged 15–24.
 March 15 – July 5, 1977. Body 10. Crawl space. Male aged 17–21.

He was buried near Gacy's barbecue pit, possibly in 1975. He wore a silver ring on his left ring finger, suggesting he may have been married.

This man had two missing upper front teeth, leading investigators to believe he likely wore a denture. He was almost certainly murdered between June 13 and August 5, 1976.

Body 13 was a man likely to have been murdered between August and October 1976. He had long, dark brown, wavy hair and was between 17 and 22 years old. This victim suffered from an abscessed tooth and may have injured his left third rib months or years before his disappearance. While Rossi also claimed to have dug this grave in the late summer of 1977, Cram claimed that during his time living at 8213 W. Summerdale, Gacy had him dig a trench in the southwest corner of the crawl space where this victim was recovered. In 2018, an updated facial reconstruction was released to the media.

He had light brown hair. This victim was buried directly above the body of William Carroll, indicating his murder had occurred on or after June 13, 1976. It is theorized Cram may not have lived with Gacy at the time of this victim's death, so a possible date for this murder is between August 6 and 20, 1976, although investigators have not discounted the possibility he may have been murdered later in 1976.

He had suffered a fractured left collarbone months or years before his disappearance. The two victims murdered on the same day in May 1976 were buried alongside him, yet sequential burial patterns of three victims murdered in 1977 leave an equal possibility he may have been murdered in the spring or summer of 1977. Statements made by Gacy following his arrest also suggest this unidentified victim may have been murdered as early as 1974. In 2018, an updated facial reconstruction was released to the media.

Possible additional victims
At the time of Gacy's arrest, he had claimed to both Des Plaines and Chicago investigators that the total number of murder victims could be as high as 45. However, only 33 victims were ever linked to Gacy. Investigators excavated the grounds of his property until they had exposed the substratum of clay beneath the foundations, finding 29 bodies.

Shortly after his arrest, Gacy informed investigators that after he had assaulted and then released Jeffrey Rignall in March 1978, he began to throw his murder victims into the Des Plaines River. He confessed to having disposed of five bodies in this manner; however, only four bodies recovered from the Des Plaines River were linked to him. When asked whether there were more victims, Gacy stated, "That's for you guys to find out."

Identification dispute of Michael Marino 
Disputed DNA and dental tests conducted between 2012 and 2016 indicate that neither body found in the common grave in Gacy's crawl space and identified as those of Kenneth Parker and Michael Marino in 1980 was actually Marino. Marino's mother had always doubted her son's identification because the clothing found on Body 14 was inconsistent with what he had worn when she last saw him. DNA testing conducted upon the exhumed body of Parker has proven that Marino's body had not been mistaken for his.

In addition, the dental X-ray conducted on the victim identified as Michael Marino had revealed he had all of his second molars; a dental X-ray conducted on Marino in March 1976 revealed one molar had not erupted. The original identification of the body identified as Michael Marino has been disputed because the exhumed body had neither an upper nor lower jaw bone. Nonetheless, the orthodontist who had identified Marino's remains has stated his conviction in the accuracy of his findings, adding he had "compared 32 teeth, probably half a dozen of them had very distinct fillings and every one of them was consistent with Michael Marino".

Death of Charles Hattula 
On May 23, 1978, 25-year-old Charles Antonio Hattula was found drowned in the Pecatonica River near Freeport, Illinois. He had been missing since May 13. Hattula was an employee of PDM and had been linked to the initial investigation of Gacy after Michael Rossi informed investigators of both Godzik's disappearance and Hattula's death. Moreover, Rossi had stated that Hattula was known to have conflicts with Gacy, and when he had "failed to show up at work", Gacy had informed him and several other employees that he had drowned. At the time of Hattula's death, no more bodies could be stored in Gacy's crawl space, which leaves a possibility he had disposed of Hattula's body in the Pecatonica River. However, Des Plaines authorities had contacted Freeport during their investigation into Gacy, and were told Hattula had fallen to his death from a bridge. Hattula's death has been officially ruled as asphyxia by drowning.

West Miami Avenue 
Retired Chicago police officer Bill Dorsch stated he had reason to believe there might be more victims buried in the grounds of the apartment building located at the 6100 block of West Miami Avenue in Chicago, a property where Gacy had been the caretaker for several years before his 1978 arrest. In 1975, Dorsch—then a Chicago police officer—observed Gacy (whom he knew on a casual basis) holding a shovel in the early hours of the morning. When Dorsch confronted him, Gacy said he was doing work that he was too busy to do during the day. Dorsch also said that several other residents of West Miami Avenue stated they had seen Gacy digging trenches in the grounds of the property in the early to mid-1970s; one of these residents also said that Gacy later placed plants in the elongated trenches he had dug. At the time these actions were observed, Gacy was still married to Carole Hoff.

In March 2012, Cook County Sheriff's officials submitted a request to excavate the grounds of this property. The Cook County State's Attorney denied the request, citing a lack of probable cause as the reason, including the results of a 1998 search of the property. However, the sheriff's office noted that in 1998, a radar survey suggested fourteen areas of interest within the property grounds, yet only two of these fourteen anomalies had been excavated. Of the twelve remaining anomalies, four were described as being "staggeringly suggestive" of human skeletons. Moreover, Dorsch had provided police with a letter from the radar company which confirmed the 1998 search of the grounds was incomplete.

A second request to excavate the grounds of West Miami Avenue was submitted to the Cook County State's Attorney by Sheriff Tom Dart in October 2012. This request was granted in January 2013, and a search of the property was conducted in the spring. Both FBI sniffer dogs and ground-penetrating radar equipment were used in the second search of West Miami Avenue; however, the search yielded no human remains.

Potential accomplices
One of the first things Gacy told investigators after his arrest was that he had not acted alone in several of the murders: he asked whether "my associates" had been arrested. When questioned whether these associates had participated directly or indirectly in the killings, Gacy replied, "Directly". He later claimed Cram and Rossi were involved in several of the murders. Some criminal defense attorneys and investigators researching the possibility Gacy had not acted alone in several of the murders have said there is "overwhelming evidence Gacy worked with an accomplice".

In the 1980s, Gacy informed FBI profiler Robert Ressler that "two or three" PDM employees had assisted in several murders. Ressler believed there were unexplained avenues to the case and that Gacy had killed more than 33 victims in multiple states. Gacy neither confirmed nor denied Ressler's suspicions. Jeffrey Rignall, who had been assaulted and tortured by Gacy in March 1978, was adamant that at one point during his ordeal, a young man with brown hair had knelt before him and watched his abuse. Rignall also said that he saw a light come on in another part of the house.

On one occasion, three days before his arrest, during their surveillance of Gacy, two officers followed him to a bar where he met two employees—Michael Rossi and Ed Hefner. An anxious Gacy was observed walking with the two out of earshot of the surveillance officers to talk privately before returning closer to the officers. Gacy said to both young men: "You'd better not let me down, you fuckers. You owe it to me." The officers then overheard sections of a hushed conversation between Gacy and the two during which Rossi asked Gacy, "And what? Buried like the other five?"

In interviews from death row, Gacy said that at the time of his arrest, three PDM employees were also considered suspects in the murders—all of whom he said were in possession of keys to his house. In addition to Cram and Rossi, Gacy named his former employee Philip Paske, who was a close associate of John Norman and an acquaintance of David Cram. In the late 1970s, Norman operated a nationwide sex trafficking ring based in Chicago known as the Delta Project. At least two victims believed to have been murdered by Gacy, Kenneth Parker and Michael Marino, had last been seen alive close to where Norman lived. This led to speculation that Gacy had been connected to this trafficking ring.

Later investigations 
Gacy claimed that he was not in Chicago when sixteen of the identified victims had disappeared. In 2012, two Chicago lawyers said travel records show that he had been in another state at the time of three of the murders, implying he was assisted by one or more accomplices. For example, Gacy had flown to Pittsburgh via Allegheny Airlines three days before the disappearance of Robert Gilroy, and returned to Chicago only the day after he disappeared.

Investigators note that Robert Young, the traveling companion with whom victim Russell Nelson was visiting Chicago at the time of his October 1977 disappearance, gave differing accounts of his disappearance to Nelson's family and investigators. Young told Nelson's family he failed to arrive at a bar at a prearranged time, but had told investigators he had last seen Nelson standing in a crowd that had gathered outside a Chicago bar, and when his attention was diverted for a few moments, Nelson had simply disappeared. Investigators contend this could not have happened without Young noticing.

Young filed a missing person's report with Chicago police before unsuccessfully requesting money from Nelson's parents to finance a search for their son. When Nelson's two brothers arrived in Chicago to search for him, Young offered them a job with PDM. Young was never summoned to testify at Gacy's trial. He died in 1987.

In a third case, travel records indicate Gacy was at a scheduled job site in Michigan at 6:00 a.m. on September 26, 1977—the day following the disappearance of 19-year-old John Mowery, who was last seen leaving his mother's house at 10:00 p.m. on September 25. Mowery's roommate was a PDM employee who formerly lived with Gacy and had moved into Mowery's apartment less than one week before Mowery's disappearance. Two witnesses have stated that this roommate had suggested to Mowery that he meet "a man who is going out of town" two days before Mowery disappeared.

Notoriety

Amber Alert
In 1984, Sam Amirante, one of Gacy's two defense attorneys at his 1980 trial, authored procedures that were incorporated by the Illinois General Assembly into the Missing Child Recovery Act of 1984. Amirante has since said the primary inspiration for this legislation was that at the time of the Gacy murders, Illinois police had to wait 72 hours before initiating a search for a missing child or adolescent.

The Illinois Missing Child Recovery Act of 1984 removed the 72-hour waiting period. Other states across America subsequently adopted similar procedures. As a result, a national network aimed at locating missing children was gradually formed. This has since developed into the Child Abduction Emergency—commonly known today as an Amber Alert.

Paintings
Isolated in his prison cell, Gacy began to paint. He drew inspiration from a wide range of sources for his artwork, with his paintings depicting subjects as diverse as Christ, birds, skulls, his own home, and John Dillinger. Many paintings were of clowns, including himself as Pogo or Patches. His "Hi Ho" series featured scenes of Walt Disney's versions of the Seven Dwarfs. Although Gacy was permitted to earn money from the sale of his paintings until 1985, he claimed his artwork was intended "to bring joy into people's lives".

Many of Gacy's paintings have been displayed at exhibitions; others have been sold at various auctions, with individual prices ranging between $200 to $20,000. Following Gacy's execution, family members of his victims publicly burned several of his paintings.

Films and documentary

Film and television
 The made-for-TV film To Catch a Killer, starring Brian Dennehy as Gacy, was released in 1992. The film is based largely on the investigation of Gacy, following the disappearance of Robert Piest, by Des Plaines Police and their efforts to arrest him before the scheduled civil suit hearing on December 22.
 A feature film, Gacy, was released in 2003. This film cast Mark Holton in the role of Gacy and depicts his life after he moved to Norwood Park in 1971 until his arrest in 1978.
 The made-for-TV film Dear Mr. Gacy, released in 2010, stars William Forsythe as Gacy. The film is based upon the book The Last Victim, written by Jason Moss. The film focuses upon the correspondence between Moss and Gacy before Gacy invited Moss to visit him on death row in 1994.
 The horror film 8213: Gacy House was released in 2010 and is based on paranormal investigators spending a night in the house built on the former site of 8213 W. Summerdale.

Documentary
 The Discovery Channel broadcast an episode relating to Gacy's crimes in the true crime series The New Detectives: Case Studies in Forensic Science. This documentary features an interview between Gacy and FBI profiler Robert Ressler.
 The Investigation Discovery channel has broadcast two documentaries about the Gacy murders. The first documentary focusing on Gacy's crimes was commissioned for the Most Evil series, a forensics program in which forensic psychiatrist Michael Stone analyzes murderers and psychopaths. The second Investigation Discovery program on Gacy is featured in the Evil Lives Here series. This program explores how Gacy's actions affected his family. Gacy's sister and niece are among those interviewed.
 The Biography Channel has broadcast a 45-minute documentary on the crimes of John Wayne Gacy.
 The television program, Psychic Investigators, broadcast an episode entitled "What Lies Below". This program focuses on the consultation between Detective Joseph Kozenczak and psychic Carol Broman, whom Kozenczak had met on December 17, 1978, to discuss the whereabouts of the body of Robert Piest.
 The Lifetime Movies network series Monster in My Family broadcast a 42-minute episode focusing on the murders committed by Gacy. This episode, titled "Killer Clown: John Wayne Gacy", was initially broadcast in August 2015. The episode features Karen Kuzma, Gacy's sister, and her daughter, and focuses on formative events in Gacy's life that may have initiated his later crimes.
 The documentary series John Wayne Gacy: Devil in Disguise. Commissioned by Peacock, the first episode of this series was broadcast in March 2021. This six-part series includes interviews with Gacy, investigators responsible for his apprehension, and Cook County Sheriff Thomas Dart.
 Conversations with a Killer: The John Wayne Gacy Tapes. Commissioned by Netflix and directed by Joe Berlinger, this series includes previously unreleased recordings of conversations between Gacy and his lawyer. The first of this three-part series was broadcast on April 20, 2022.

See also
 Capital punishment in Illinois
 List of people executed in Illinois
 List of serial killers by number of victims
 List of serial killers in the United States

Notes

References

Cited works

Further reading 
 Killer Clown: The True Story of John Wayne Gacy, by Aimee Baxter. 
 John Wayne Gacy: Hunting a Predator, by John Borowski. 
 Johnny and Me: The True Story of John Wayne Gacy, by Barry Boschelli. 
 A Question of Doubt: The John Wayne Gacy Story, by John Wayne Gacy. 
 The Chicago Killer: The Hunt for Serial Killer John Wayne Gacy, by Joseph R. and Karen M. Kozenczak. 
 Unfinished Nightmare: The Search for More Victims of Serial Killer John Wayne Gacy, by Chris Maloney. 
 The Last Victim: A True-Life Journey into the Mind of the Serial Killer, by Jason Moss.
 29 Below, by Jeffrey Rignall and Ron Wilder. 
 Destination Gacy: A Cross-Country Journey to Shake the Devil's Hand, by Nancy Rommelmann.

External links

 Archived FBI files relating to John Gacy
 1993 Decision of Gacy's case by the United States Court of Appeals for the Seventh Circuit, rejecting his federal appeal
 John Wayne Gacy's Other Victims: A website detailing the ongoing investigation by Detective Bill Dorsch into the possibility Gacy had committed other murders

1942 births
1994 deaths
 
1970s murders in the United States
20th-century American LGBT people
20th-century executions by Illinois
20th-century executions of American people
American clowns
American male criminals
American male painters
American murderers of children
American people convicted of child sexual abuse
American people convicted of sodomy
American people of Danish descent
American people of Polish descent
American rapists
Bisexual men
Catholics from Illinois
Catholics from Iowa
Crimes in Chicago
Criminals from Chicago
Executed American serial killers
Executed people from Illinois
Illinois Democrats
Iowa Democrats
LGBT people from Illinois
LGBT Roman Catholics
Male serial killers
Necrophiles
People convicted of murder by Illinois
People executed by Illinois by lethal injection
People from Waterloo, Iowa
People with antisocial personality disorder
Torture in the United States
Violence against men in North America